The Randall Kenan Prize for Black LGBTQ Fiction is an annual literary award presented by the Lambda Literary Foundation, established in 2021 in honor of Randall Kenan. The award is presented "to a Black LGBTQ writer whose fiction explores themes of Black LGBTQ life, culture, and/or history."  Nominees "must have published at least one book and show promise in continuing to produce groundbreaking work." Winners receive a $3,000 cash prize.

Recipient

References 

Lambda Literary Awards
Awards established in 2021
English-language literary awards
Lists of LGBT-related award winners and nominees